Ommastrephes brevimanus is a species of flying squid in the family Ommastrephinae native to the Kermadec Islands.

Reference

Squid
Cephalopods described in 1852
Molluscs of the Pacific Ocean